Schenley Tunnel (also known as the Neville Street Tunnel and Pittsburgh Junction Railroad Tunnel) is a railroad tunnel in Pittsburgh, Pennsylvania, United States. The tunnel runs beneath Neville Street in the city's North Oakland neighborhood; the south portal is at the upper end of Junction Hollow emerging from under Filmore St., the north emerges from under Centre Ave. into a ravine that opens into Skunk Hollow, between North Oakland and Bloomfield.

Schenley Tunnel measures  in length and runs about  beneath Neville Street. It carries CSX Transportation's P&W Subdivision. The Allegheny Valley Railroad, a short-line railroad, uses the tunnel for regional services. Amtrak's Capitol Limited also uses the tunnel when entering and leaving the city.

History

Excavation on the tunnel began about May 1883 and continued for nine months. By August 1883, a vertical shaft reached the tunnel's midpoint, and additional excavation began from the inside, working in both directions. In May 1884, brick masons were hired to build the arched passage lining the tunnel. The official opening was delayed until December 1884, when the Junction Railroad's bridge across the Allegheny River and Herr's Island was opened, completing the connecting railroad.

Shaw, Stearns & Norris, railroad builders from Columbus, Ohio were the contractors. While the original Schenley tunnel is still in use, the bridge was replaced in 1920.

References

External links

 Schenley Tunnel at pghbridges.com

Tunnels completed in 1884
Railroad tunnels in Pennsylvania